The 2009 Bombardier Learjet 550 was the sixth round of the 2009 IndyCar Series season, held on June 6, 2009 at the  Texas Motor Speedway, in Fort Worth, Texas.

Race

Standings after the race 

Drivers' Championship standings

 Note: Only the top five positions are included for the standings.

References

Bombardier Learjet 550
Bombardier Learjet 550
Bombardier Learjet 550
Firestone 600